The Belovezha Accords are accords forming the agreement declaring that the Union of Soviet Socialist Republics (USSR) had effectively ceased to exist and established the Commonwealth of Independent States (CIS) in its place as a successor entity. The documentation was signed at the state dacha near Viskuli in Belovezhskaya Pushcha (Belarus) on 8 December 1991, except by the defunct one, by leaders of three of the four republics which had signed the 1922 Treaty on the Creation of the USSR:
 Belarusian Parliament Chairman Stanislav Shushkevich and Prime Minister of Belarus Vyacheslav Kebich
 Russian President Boris Yeltsin and First Deputy Prime Minister of the RSFSR/Russian Federation Gennady Burbulis
 Ukrainian President Leonid Kravchuk and Ukrainian Prime Minister Vitold Fokin

As Shushkevich said in 2006, by December "the union had already been broken up by the putschists" who in August 1991 tried to remove Mikhail Gorbachev from power to prevent the transformation of the Soviet Union into what Shushkevich described as "a confederation." The three wanted to avoid what happened in the Breakup of Yugoslavia and "there was no other way out of the situation than a divorce."

Name
The name is variously translated as Belavezh Accords, Belovezh Accords, Belovezha Accords, Belavezha Agreement, the Belovezhskaya Accord, the Belaya Vezha Accord, etc. A reason of the discrepancy is the difference between Russian and Belarusian transliteration of the eponymous forest's name on the Belarus-Polish border that used to have General Secretary Brezhnev’s hunting lodge.

Key points 
The text of the Belovezh Accords contains an introduction and 14 Articles. The original text is available in official translation on the Council of Europe website.

The main obligations of the parties to the Agreement, ratified by all former Soviet republics except Estonia, Latvia and Lithuania, includes the following:

 The end of the existence of the USSR, with the "setting up of lawfully constituted democratic… independent states… on the basis of mutual recognition of and respect for State sovereignty".
 Establishing on the territory the "right to self-determination" along with "norms relating to human and people’s rights".
 "Parties guarantee to their citizens, regardless of their nationality or other differences, equal rights and freedoms. Each of the Parties guarantees to the citizens of the other Parties, and also to stateless persons resident in their territory, regardless of national affiliation or other differences, civil, political, social, economic and cultural rights and freedoms in accordance with the universal recognized international norms relating to human rights" (Article 2).
 "The Parties, desirous of facilitating the expression, preservation and development of the distinctive ethnic, cultural, linguistic and religious characteristics of the national minorities resident in their territories and of the unique ethno-cultural regions that have come into being, will extend protection to them" (Article 3).
 "Equitable cooperation" (Article 4).
 "Territorial integrity" along with "freedom of movement of citizens" (Article 5).

Legal basis and ratification 
The preamble of the document stated that "the USSR, as a subject of international law and a geopolitical reality, is ceasing its existence". It also invited other republics to join the three founding members. While there was some dispute over the authority of the leaders of three of the 12 republics to dissolve the entire Union, individual union republics had the right to secede freely from the Union according to Article 72 of the 1977 Soviet Constitution; since 1990, the procedure for the withdrawal of republics from the Union was regulated by a special law. 

On 10 December, the agreement was ratified by the Verkhovna Rada of Ukraine and the Supreme Council of Belarus. On 12 December, the Supreme Soviet of the Russian SFSR formally ratified the Belovezh Accords, denounced (that is, withdrew from) the 1922 Treaty on the Creation of the Soviet Union, and recalled the Russian deputies from the Supreme Soviet of the USSR. Some members of the Russian parliament disputed the legality of this ratification, since according to the Constitution of the RSFSR of 1978, consideration of this document was in the exclusive jurisdiction of the Congress of People's Deputies of the RSFSR.

What remained of the Soviet federal government also argued that the purported dissolution was illegal and ineffective. Gorbachev described the moves thusly:

The fate of the multinational state cannot be determined by the will of the leaders of three republics. The question should be decided only by constitutional means with the participation of all sovereign states and taking into account the will of all their citizens. The statement that Unionwide legal norms would cease to be in effect is also illegal and dangerous; it can only worsen the chaos and anarchy in society. The hastiness with which the document appeared is also of serious concern. It was not discussed by the populations nor by the Supreme Soviets of the republics in whose name it was signed. Even worse, it appeared at the moment when the draft treaty for a Union of Sovereign States, drafted by the USSR State Council, was being discussed by the parliaments of the republics.

The question as to whether the Belovezh Accords were enough in and of themselves to dissolve the Soviet Union with the agreement of only three republics (albeit three of the largest and most powerful republics) was resolved on 21 December 1991, when the representatives of 11 of the 12 remaining Soviet republics—all except Georgia—signed the Alma-Ata Protocol, which reiterated both the end of the Soviet Union and the establishment of the CIS. Given that 11 of the republics now agreed that the Soviet Union no longer existed, the plurality of member-republics required for its effective continuance as a federal state was no longer in place. The Alma-Ata signatories also provisionally accepted Gorbachev's resignation as president of the Soviet Union and agreed on several other practical measures consequential to the extinction of the Union. Gorbachev stated that he would resign as soon as he knew the CIS was a reality. Three days later, in a secret meeting with Yeltsin, he accepted the fait accompli of the Soviet Union's dissolution.

Although Gorbachev had long since lost the ability to influence events outside Moscow, a rump Soviet federal government continued to exist for four more days, and Gorbachev continued to hold control over the Kremlin. This ended in the early hours of 25 December 1991 when Gorbachev resigned and turned control of the Kremlin and the remaining powers of his office over to the office of the president of Russia, Yeltsin. Soon afterward, the flag of the Soviet Union was lowered from the Kremlin Senate for the final time, and the flag of Russia was hoisted in its place.

Later that day, President of the United States George H. W. Bush gave a short speech on national television in the United States to mark the end of the Cold War and to recognize the independence of the former states of the Soviet Union.

Also on 25 December 1991, the Russian SFSR, now no longer a sub-national entity of the Soviet Union but a sovereign nation in its own right, adopted a law renaming itself the "Russian Federation" or "Russia" (both being equally official with the ratification of the Russian constitution in 1993).

Gorbachev's speech, as well as the replacement of the Soviet flag with the Russian flag, were all seen around the world, and marked the de facto end of the Soviet Union.  However, the final legal step in the dissolution came a day later, when the Soviet of Republics, the upper house of the Supreme Soviet of the USSR, recognized the collapse of the Union and voted both itself and the Union out of existence. The lower house, the Soviet of the Union, had not met since 12 December when Russia recalled its deputies from both chambers, leaving it without a quorum.

The Summit of Alma-Ata also issued a statement on 21 December 1991, supporting Russia's claim to be recognized as the successor state of the Soviet Union for the purposes of membership of the United Nations. On 25 December 1991, Russian President Yeltsin informed UN Secretary-General Javier Pérez de Cuéllar that the Soviet Union had been dissolved and that Russia would, as its successor state, continue the Soviet Union's membership in the United Nations. The document confirmed the credentials of the representatives of the Soviet Union as representatives of Russia and requested that the name "Soviet Union" be changed to "Russian Federation" in all records and entries. This was a move designed to allow Russia to retain the Soviet Union's permanent Security Council seat, which would not have been possible if the former republics were all reckoned as equal successors of the Soviet Union, or if the Soviet Union was regarded as having no successor state for the purpose of continuing the same UN membership (see Russia and the United Nations). The Secretary-General circulated the request, and there being no objection from any Member State, the Russian Federation took the Soviet Union's UN seat. On 31 January 1992, Russian Federation President Yeltsin personally took part in a Security Council meeting as representative of Russia, the first Security Council meeting in which Russia occupied the permanent Security Council seat originally granted to the Soviet Union by the UN Charter.

Aftermath

Subsequent civil wars and paper wars in Russia 
Several sub-republics of the USSR (Moscovy branch) took their lead from the Singing Revolution (1987-1991) in the Baltic states and saw in the Belovezhskaya Accords the promise of rights to self-determination. From July to December 1990, there was a "parade of sovereignties" of the autonomous republics and autonomous regions of the USSR. Most of the autonomous republics declared themselves to be Soviet socialist republics. On 20 July 1991, the Supreme Soviet of the North Ossetian Autonomous Soviet Socialist Republic adopted a declaration on state sovereignty. Following this, on 9 August the Declaration on State Sovereignty of the Karelian ASSR was adopted, 19 August 1991 Soviet coup d'état attempt, 29 August the Komi ASSR, 20 September the Udmurt Republic, 27 September the Yakut-Sakha SSR which later split into the Yakut ASSR and the Sakha Republic, 8 October the Buryat ASSR, 11 October the Bashkir ASSR, 18 October the Kalmyk ASSR, 22 October Mari ASSR, 24 October the Chuvash ASSR, 25 October the Gorno-Altai Autonomous Okrug, 12 December Tuva ASSR. On 18 October 1991 the Yamalo-Nenets Autonomous Okrug declared sovereignty. The following also renamed and upgraded their status to republics: the Republic of Adygea, the Republic of Dagestan, the Kabardino-Balkarian Republic, the Karachay-Cherkess Republic, the Mordovian ASSR, the Republic of Khakassia.

These operations rarely degenerated into armed conflict because the central government in Moscovy held overwhelming military power, as evidenced in the Chechen Republic of Ichkeria which descended in 1994 into open warfare known as the First Chechen War. The Chechen example served to dissuade independence movements for example in: 
 Tatar Soviet Socialist Republic

Later when evaluating certain provisions of the legislation of various constituent entities of the Russian Federation for their compliance with the Constitution of the Russian Federation, the Constitutional Court repeatedly stated the constitutional and legal impossibility and illegality of the "two-tier sovereignty" of the Russian Federation and its constituent entities. So, in particular one must read Resolution of 7 June 2000 No. 10-P "On the case of checking the constitutionality of certain provisions of the Constitution of the Republic of Altai and the Federal Law 'On the general principles of organizing legislative (representative) and executive bodies of state power of subjects of the Russian Federation'". With that the matter was closed.

Subsequent conflicts ex-Russia 
A few irredentists or trouble-makers saw in the Belovezhskaya Accords the promise of rights to self-determination. Wherever these "Gorbachev votes" could be scheduled, they were. This caused a number of subsequent armed civil conflicts, including:
Georgian civil war over the Abkhaz ASSR and South Ossetia
Adjara ASSR
Transnistrian war
Gagauzia
Karakalpak Autonomous Soviet Socialist Republic and its successor, Karakalpakstan
Nakhichevan Autonomous Republic
Nagorno-Karabakh Republic
Autonomous Republic of Badakhshan
Crimean ASSR
Declaration of State Sovereignty of the Kazakh SSR

1993 Russian constitutional crisis 

According to some Russian politicians, one of the reasons for the political crisis of 1993 was the repeated refusal of the Congress of People's Deputies of Russia to ratify the Belovezhskaya Agreement and to exclude the mention of the Constitution and laws of the USSR from the text of the Constitution of the RSFSR.

Belarus loses its copy of document
Stanislav Shushkevich, the former leader of Belarus, was told by the country's foreign ministry that the original accords have gone missing as of 7 February 2013. He tried to obtain the original copy to assist in writing his memoirs.

See also
Dissolution of the Soviet Union
Union Treaty of 1922, which was denounced by the Belovezh Accords.

Notes

References

Bibliography
 Ostrovsky, Alexander (2011). Глупость или измена? Расследование гибели СССР. (Stupidity or treason? Investigation of the death of the USSR)  М.: Форум, Крымский мост-9Д, 2011. — 864 с. ISBN 978-5-89747-068-6.

External links

Facsimile and transcription (in Russian)
map location

1991 in Belarus
1991 in Russia
1991 in the Soviet Union
1991 in Ukraine
Belarus–Russia relations
Belarus–Ukraine relations
Dissolution of the Soviet Union
Russia–Ukraine relations
Treaties concluded in 1991
Treaties entered into force in 1991
Treaties of Belarus
Treaties of Russia
Treaties of the Russian Soviet Federative Socialist Republic
Treaties of the Soviet Union
Treaties of Ukraine
Boris Yeltsin
December 1991 events in Europe
1990s in Minsk
Events in Minsk
History of diplomacy
Commonwealth of Independent States law